Harvey Antonio Blair (born 14 September 2003) is an English footballer who plays as a forward for  club Liverpool.

Early life 
Blair was born in Huddersfield, England. He is of Jamaican descent.

Club career 
Blair was originally part of Manchester United's youth setup, but later joined Liverpool as an U12 player. He signed his first professional contract in October 2020. He was later promoted to the Under-18 squad for the 2020–21 season. His first year was greatly impacted by injury as he made just four appearances and scored two goals. In the 2021–22 season, he has made five league appearances and scored one goal for the academy side, impressing enough to be promoted to the senior team.

Blair made his professional debut in an EFL Cup game against Preston on 27 October 2021. He was brought off after 55 minutes. Liverpool manager Jürgen Klopp said about Blair's performance: "The game for Harvey in the first half was really not easy and in the second half as well. We didn’t really involve him in the game. That doesn’t help."

Style of play 
Blair has been described as a 'tricky winger' who is 'blessed with good pace, size and ball control'.

He's traditionally played as a left winger under under-18s manager Bridge-Wilkinson, but can also operate as a striker and a little bit deeper in a no.10 role.

Personal life 
His older brother, Marley, was also in the Liverpool academy before being released by the club. He is playing for Icelandic club Keflavík ÍF.

Career statistics

References 

2003 births
Living people
English footballers
English sportspeople of Jamaican descent
Footballers from Huddersfield
Liverpool F.C. players
Association football forwards